Schnell is a surname of German origin meaning fast or quickly and may refer to:

Claude Schnell (contemporary), heavy metal keyboardist
Edward Schnell (fl. mid-19th century), German arms dealer in Japan; brother of Henry Schnell
F. Wolfgang Schnell (1913–2006), German professor of applied genetics and plant breeding
Georg H. Schnell (1878–1951), German film actor
Henry Schnell (fl. mid-19th century), German arms dealer in Japan; brother of Edward Schnell

Hermann Josef Schnell (1916–1999), German polymer chemist

Karl-Heinz Schnell (1915–2013),  German ace fighter pilot in the Luftwaffe during World War II
Matt Schnell (born 1990), American mixed martial artist
Ray Schnell (1893–1970), American politician from North Dakota; state legislator and lieutenant governor
Santiago Schnell (contemporary), biophysical chemistry and computational biologist
Siegfried Schnell (1916–1944), German ace fighter pilot in the Luftwaffe during World War II
Spencer Schnell (born 1994), American football player

See also
 Snellius (disambiguation)

German-language surnames